The Georgia Board of Regents oversees the University System of Georgia as part of the state government of Georgia in the United States. The University System of Georgia is composed of all state public institutions of higher education in the state. The Board of Regents also preside over the Georgia Public Library Service.

History
The Board was organized on January 1, 1932, to create centralized control over all member institutions. The Board marked the first period that public institutions of higher education were governed and managed under a sole authority. The governor appoints members of the Board, each of whom serve seven years. Today the Board of Regents is composed of 19 members, five of whom are appointed from the state-at-large, and one from each of the state’s 14 congressional districts. The Board elects a chancellor who serves as its chief executive officer and the chief administrative officer of the University System.

Governing authority
The Board oversees 26 institutions of higher education: four research universities, four comprehensive universities, 9 state universities, and 9 state colleges. In fiscal 2003, there were 10,626 faculty positions and 241,878 students. Those numbers grew to 35,000 and 253,000, respectively, in 2006.

Public funding for member institutions is distributed by the Board. In fiscal year 2003, the Board dispensed $1,697,287,628 of funding, authorized by the Georgia General Assembly. In 2006, the budget grew to $5 billion.

Organization
The Board consists of 19 voting members, serving seven-year terms. The Governor appoints, subject to Senate confirmation, one from each Congressional district and five at-large members.

The Board appoints a chief executive for the system, known as a chancellor. Dr. Steve Wrigley became the 13th Chancellor in 2017.

Previous chancellors include Charles Mercer Snelling (1932–1933), Steadman Vincent Sanford (1935-1945), Harmon White Caldwell (1948-1964), Erroll B. Davis, Jr. (2006-2011), and Hank Huckaby (2011-2017).

Each individual institution has its own President and senior staff.  The system of 26 colleges and universities includes the  University of Georgia, the state's flagship land-grant, sea-grant, space-grant, and sun-grant research university, Fort Valley State University, a historically black land-grant university, Skidaway Institute of Oceanography, which specializes in coastal and marine environments and became part of the University of Georgia in 2013, the Georgia Institute of Technology, which has a strong emphasis in technology and engineering, Augusta University that includes the Medical College of Georgia, and the Georgia Public Library Service, which distributes state funding to 385 libraries in the state's 61 public library systems.

See also
University System of Georgia
Student Advisory Council of Georgia

References

External links 

Student Advisory Council

University System of Georgia
1932 establishments in Georgia (U.S. state)